Tara Seibel (born February 4, 1973) is an American cartoonist, graphic designer and illustrator from Cleveland. Her work has been published in Chicago Newcity, Funny Times, The Austin Chronicle, Cleveland Scene, Heeb Magazine, SMITH Magazine, Mineshaft Magazine, Juxtapoz, Jewish Review of Books, Cleveland Free Times, USA Today, US Catholic, The New York Times, Los Angeles Times and The Paris Review.

Early life
Tara Seibel was born Tara Murphy in Cleveland, Ohio, to Lauren Murphy (née Gieseler) and Robert Murphy. Seibel grew up in Wickliffe, Ohio. While attending High School, 
Seibel was a majorette and twirled fire on the field. She played the xylophone and wrote for the school paper. Varsity lettered in track and field for the high jump. Her mother was a homemaker and helped manage family business. Tara’s father was a business owner and politician, (now deceased) was also a local talk show radio host. Tara was a frequent guest and would talk politics with her dad as the "liberal daughter". Tara started drawing political cartoons for her father's campaigns and various newsletters at a young age. Seibel is the oldest of three siblings, Lauren Murphy-Holder a psychologist and Robert Murphy Jr. a businessman. Tara's grandfather Richard Gieseler, was a foreman for Cleveland Twist Drill, and met his wife Dorothea (née Newman)  at the Cleveland Twist Drill Company. Her grandfather (John "Buck" Buchan) was a local musician who played with "Cleveland's Polka King" Frankie Yankovic and comedian-musician Mickey Katz.

Career
Seibel earned a Bachelor of Fine Arts degree after majoring in Applied Media Arts at Edinboro University of Pennsylvania, where she studied drawing, painting, documentary film, illustration, animation, journalism, photography and graphic design. Her first printed piece was a poster design for the Edinboro University Alternative Film Festival. She completed this accredited project during an internship at Murphy Design on East 40th Street in Cleveland.

Seibel began her professional artistic career in Chicago illustrating covers for restaurant menus and food packaging. One of the first menus she designed was for Michael Jordan The Restaurant. Eventually she moved back home to Cleveland. She was hired as a line designer and illustrator for American Greetings where she designed and illustrated gift wrapping and greeting cards. After leaving American Greetings she became a freelance editorial cartoonist. Over a span of four years, she created editorial cartoons for US Catholic Magazine, various newsletters, Cleveland Scene and illustrated a cover of the Cleveland Free Times. In 2008, Seibel attended a Jewish Author's in Comics Symposium. When she got there the only seat left open was the one next to Harvey Pekar. They struck up a conversation. This led her to a collaboration with the late Cleveland-based cartoonist Harvey Pekar, the author of American Splendor.

After headlining the Pekar Project for SMITH Magazine, Seibel's work was discovered by editor Russ Kick. Kick is the editor of a three-volume, 1500-page anthology set titled The Graphic Canon which features the world's great literature interpreted by over 120 artists and illustrators including R. Crumb, Maxon Crumb, Will Eisner, Molly Crabapple, Sharon Rudahl, Dame Darcy, S. Clay Wilson, Gris Grimly, Roberta Gregory and Kim Deitch. For the Graphic Canon Volume One, Seibel contributed adaptations of Victor Hugo's Les Miserables and Walt Whitman's Leaves of Grass. For Volume Two, Seibel adapted, F. Scott Fitzgerald's The Great Gatsby and a series of graphic biographies of Jack Kerouac, Diane di Prima, William S. Burroughs, Allen Ginsberg and Freud's "Interpretation of Dreams". She graphically adapted Oscar Wilde's, The Nightingale and the Rose."

Community work

In 2011, Seibel taught workshops at Ursuline College, a small, Roman Catholic liberal arts women's college in Pepper Pike; learning and teaching watercolor techniques under the practice of Sr. Kathleen Burke P.H.d the founder of the Master of Arts in Counseling and Art Therapy program.

In 2012, Tara created the class "How to design your own greeting card line" for adult education classes at the Pepper Pike Learning Center.

In 2013, she became the curator and gallery owner of Tara Seibel Art Gallery in Cleveland's Historic Little Italy in University Circle.  At the gallery there are exhibits of paintings, crafts, drawings and some comic art on display. She also has exhibits for local artists in the Cleveland Area. This will be the third year the gallery will participate in the "from WOMEN" show curated by Mary Urbas of Lakeland Community College to celebrate Women's History month.

Tara illustrates the art walk posters for the Little Italy neighborhood.

The summer of 2016, she started instructing summer camp at The Fairmount Center for the Arts, in which children were engaged in keeping an 
art diary every day for a week, writing, drawing, painting and taking photos of their personal stories for documentation and therapy. This summer she will be adding calligraphy techniques, and "the lost art of handwriting" to the curriculum.

In 2016, she offered to design and illustrate the Short Sweet Film Fest  poster, an annual film festival held in Cleveland, Ohio. And was asked to give a Q & A about the late Harvey Pekar, one of the film subjects.

2019, Seibel will be teaching painting classes at Fairmount Center for the Arts

Personal life
Seibel resides with her family in the Cleveland suburb of Pepper Pike. Her husband Aaron Seibel, is a graduate of Marquette University, an optical engineer and co-inventor for two patents. The Seibels have three children, Lauren, Patrick and Oscar.

Selected bibliography

 Solo editorial cartoons and comic strips 
 Al Fresco Dining in Cleveland cover illustration, Cleveland Free Times, May 2003.
 Show Me the Way to go Home in U.S. Catholic/Volume 71, No 2, February 2006.
 My Prolife Protest in U.S. Catholic/Volume 71, No 5, May 2006.
 For Extra Credit in U.S. Catholic/Volume 71, No 8, August 2006.
 A less-Catholic Europe. in U.S. Catholic/Volume 71, No 9, September 2006.
 Criminal intent. in U.S. Catholic/Volume 71, No 10, October 2006.
 A Poor Measure of Poverty in U.S. Catholic/Volume 71, No 11, November 2006.
 Cramming for Christmas in U.S. Catholic/Volume 71, No 12, December 2006.
 Cleveland Scene Alternative Weekly,  Lake View Cemetery August, 2008Juxtapoz Art & Culture Magazine,  Anthony Bordain / From R. Crumb's 78 Record Collection illustrations by Tara Seibel, July 2010
 New York Times Harvey in the Spring editorial illustration by Tara Seibel, July 2010.

 Collaborative comix and cartoons, illustrations and comic strips 
 Rock City-Terminally ILL Question written and illustrated by Tara Seibel, Chicago Newcity, Vol.23, No.1045 July 2008.
 Rock City-Terminally ILL Lake View Cemetery written and illustrated by Tara Seibel, (first published), Cleveland Free Times, July 2008.
 Rock City-Terminally ILL Lake View Cemetery written and illustrated by Tara Seibel, Vol.23, No.1047 July 2008.
 Rock City-Terminally ILL Tara the Cartoonist written and illustrated by Tara Seibel,  Vol.23, No.1062 September 2008.
 Rock City-Terminally ILL' Hey, Emily written by Harvey Pekar and illustrated by Tara Seibel, (first published) The Austin Chronicle, Vol.27, No.49 August, 2008.
 Rock City-Terminally ILL Bathtub Movers written by Harvey Pekar and illustrated by Tara Seibel, Funny Times, Vol.23, Issue 7, July, 2008.
 Rock City-Terminally ILL Hey, Emily written by Harvey Pekar and illustrated by Tara Seibel, Chicago Newcity, Vol.23, No.1054 September, 2008.
 Rock City-Terminally ILL A Certain Kind of Trait written by Harvey Pekar and illustrated by Tara Seibel, Chicago Newcity, (first published) Vol.23, No.1056, September, 2008.
 Rock City-Terminally ILL Da Vinci For Dummies written by Harvey Pekar and illustrated by Tara Seibel, Chicago Newcity, (first published) Vol.23, No.1060, October, 2008.
 Rock City-Terminally ILL Lake View Cemetery written and illustrated by Tara Seibel, Mineshaft, editor(s) Everett Rand & Gioia Palmieri No.23, November, 2008. 
 Heeb -The Politics Issue, Are God's Children Too Stupid? written by Harvey Pekar and illustrated by Tara Seibel, Issue No/18, Fall 2008
 Jewish Review of Books,  The Genesis Review written by Harvey Pekar and illustrated by Tara Seibel, Spring 2010
 Jewish Review of Books,  Upmanship & Downmanship written by Harvey Pekar and illustrated by Tara Seibel, Summer 2010

 Self-published comix 
 Rock City-Terminally ILL Comix written by Tara Seibel, Harvey Pekar, illustrations by Tara Seibel, Joseph Remnant, Rick Parker, and Sean Pryor, Issue 1, 2009
 Rock City-Terminally ILL Contributions from Harvey Pekar, Robert Crumb, Pablo Guerra, Camilovsky, Mark Murphy and Joel Nakamura, Issue 2, 2010

 Illustration and comics for anthology projects 
 The Vestibule written and illustrated by Tara Seibel, "Next Door Neighbor Series" SMITH Magazine 2009; editor Dean Haspiel
 The Pekar Project written by Harvey Pekar and illustrated by Tara Seibel, "Pekar & Crumb, Talkin' 'Bout Art", "The Art of Making Sushi", "No Reservations", "Phone Hustlers", "da Vinci For Dummies", "A Certain Kind of Trait" and "Oscar the Amazing Baby", 2010; editor Jeff Newelt
 Comics' Comics "Cartoons Drawn By Your Favorite Comedians" Compiled by Eric Beasley/excerpt "Sorry, this is the best I can do" written by Harvey Pekar and illustrated by Tara Seibel, Rick Parker, Sean Pryor and Joseph Remnant Mark Batty Publisher, May 2011 
 The Graphic Canon Volume II/ Adaptations by Tara Seibel, Victor Hugo;Les Misérables, Walt Whitman;Leaves of Grass, Seven Stories Press 2010; editor Russ Kick, 
 The Graphic Canon Volume III/ Adaptations by Tara Seibel, F. Scott Fitzgerald;The Great Gatsby, Biographies of the Beat Generation, Sigmund Freud; Interpretation of Dreams, Seven Stories Press 2013; editor Russ Kick 
 The Graphic Canon of Children's Literature: The Worlds Great Kids' Lit As Comics and Visuals (editor Russ Kick). Seven Stories Press, summer 2014, 
 Long Story Short : Turning Famous Books into Cartoons'' (editor Mr. Fish). Akashic Books, summer 2020,

References

Notes
 Juxtapoz Magazine interview 1
 Juxtapoz Magazine interview 2, July 8, 2010

External links
 

1973 births
American women cartoonists
American women illustrators
American graphic designers
Women graphic designers
Female comics writers
American female comics artists
Living people
Artists from Cleveland
People from Wickliffe, Ohio
American cartoonists
21st-century American women